Fool on the Hill is a 1988 comic fantasy novel by Matt Ruff, set at Cornell University in Ithaca, New York.

Plot summary
 
Fool on the Hill is about a man “who tells lies for a living” (aka a fiction writer) and his fantastical year as a writer-in-residence at Cornell University. S.T. George (the professional liar) finds himself the hero of a story started long ago by Mr. Sunshine, a storyteller who “writes” without paper. Our hero’s story will have love and loss, princesses and dragons, and of course, an epic battle to see if the knight slays the dragon. S.T. George isn’t on his own, though, there is a whole host of magical, eccentric, and all too real characters to help the story along. The Rat Frat led by Chief Rat, Jack Baron; the Bohemians, a group of Harley-and horseback-riding students; a dog name Luther and his cat friend Blackjack; Sprites that fly miniature planes and watch over the humans of Cornell; the villain Grub; and two intriguing women, the mysterious Calliope and the lovely Aurora. Will, Mr. Sunshine’s hero, rescue the princess and save the day, or does his love of Greek tragedy have another end in store for George. 

--taken in part from Warner Books mass paperback edition.

The novel is the story of two authors, the buffoonish Prof. Stephen Titus George and his artful adversary Mr. Sunshine. Both live in Ithaca, New York. 

During a particularly cold New York winter, George starts to suspect that he is not himself but the creation of someone else, someone he calls "Mr. Sunshine." Sunshine and George enter into a battle of wits to determine who should be called "creator." Did George create himself? Did Mr. Sunshine create George? What is the meaning of collaboration?

Throughout the novel colorful characters on the campus of Cornell University appear. There is the mysterious Cornell student Aurora Borealis Smith with whom Stephen Titus George falls in love. There is the Norse God Ragnarok wielding his Pollaxe. There are the Bohemians, a dog named Luther, a cat named Blackjack, Puck, and Calliope, a fire-breathing paper dragon. And let's not forget evil forces like Rasferret the Grub, a mannequin called Rubbermaid, and an army of rats. 

And so the drama then unfolds as it tells the time-tested story of the battle between Good and Evil and the efforts of the two authors to write the story towards either a happy ending or a tragic Greek drama.

External links
Matt Ruff official website
A 1998 review by David Soyka at sfsite.com
A 1998 review by Sara Lipowitz at flowerfire.com

1988 American novels
American fantasy novels
Cornell University
Novels set in New York (state)
Campus novels
Novels by Matt Ruff
Atlantic Monthly Press books